Embu, also known as Kîembu, is a Bantu language of Kenya. It is spoken by the Embu people, also known as the Aembu (sg. Muembu). Speakers of the Embu language can also be found in neighboring districts/counties and in the diaspora. 

The language is closely related to the Kikuyu and Kimeru languages.

Dialects 
Embu has two known dialects; Mbeere (Mbere, Kimbeere) and Embu proper. Native Embu speakers can also tell apart a speaker from areas close to Mount Kenya, because they speak with a slight dialect locally called Kiruguru (Kirũgũrũ).

Sample Translations 
Sample translations of words from English to Kiembu. Note:  Accented characters or diacritical mark are not shown in the following two tables.

Sample Phrases

References

 
Northeast Bantu languages
Languages of Kenya